The Kreutzer Sonata is a 1911 Russian silent film directed by Pyotr Chardynin. The film is considered lost.

Cast
 Pyotr Chardynin 
 Ivan Mozzhukhin as Trukhachevski  
 Lyubov Varyagina

References

Bibliography
 Christie, Ian & Taylor, Richard. The Film Factory: Russian and Soviet Cinema in Documents 1896-1939. Routledge, 2012.

External links

1911 films
Russian silent films
Films based on The Kreutzer Sonata
Lost Russian films
Russian black-and-white films
Films of the Russian Empire
1911 lost films